The Profen Coal Mine is a coal mine located in Saxony-Anhalt. The mine has coal reserves amounting to 115 million tonnes of lignite, one of the largest coal reserves in Europe and the world and has an annual production of 9 million tonnes of coal. Mibrag pays €550 million ($644 million) in local taxes per year, or 16 percent of the district's revenue.

References 

Coal mines in Germany
Mining in Saxony-Anhalt
Burgenlandkreis